Sándor Szabó (25 April 1915 – 12 November 1997) was a Hungarian actor. He appeared in 80 films and television shows between 1935 and 1997.

Selected filmography

 Once in a Blue Moon (1935) - Ivan
 Pusztai királykisasszony (1939) - John MacPercy
 Pénz beszél (1940) - Dárday István
 Ne kérdezd, ki voltam (1941) - Ákos, Mohainé fia
 Mission to Moscow (1943) - Ski Troop Lieutenant (uncredited)
 Boldog idök (1943) - Márton
 Zörgetnek az ablakon (1944)
 Passage to Marseille (1944) - Sergeant of the Guards (uncredited)
 Machita (1944) - Kovács Gábor, mérnök
 Vihar után (1945) - Bordás Géza
 Tüz (1948) - A gazdasági rendõrség tisztje
 Forró mezök (1948) - Rendõrkapitány
 Janika (1949) - Balla János
 Különös házasság (1951) - Vicar Szucsinka
 Déryné (1951) - Déry István
 Dreamboat (1952) - Giant Arab (uncredited)
 Erkel (1952) - Petrichevich Horváth Lázár
 Föltámadott a tenger (1953) - Molnár Ferdinánd
 A város alatt (1953) - Zilahi
 2x2 néha 5 (1954) - Bálint
 Rákóczi hadnagya (1954) - Gróf Starhemberg Maximilan generális
 Életjel (1955) - Deák
 Hell's Island (1955) - Johann Torbig
 Az élet hídja (1956) - Jánosi, fõmérnök
 Az eltüsszentett birodalom (1956) - Hadvezér
 Egy magyar nábob (1966)
 Mission: Impossible: Nitro (1969) - Ismir Najiid
 Topaz (1969) - Emile Redon
 Bluebeard (1972) - The doctor
 A Strange Role (1976) - Wallach doktor
 Fekete gyémántok (1976) - Sámuel apát
 80 huszár (1978) - Leopold Krüger tábornok
 Hungarians (1978) - Német gazda
 Legato (1978) - Galkó Ervin
 Nem élhetek muzsikaszó nélkül (1978) - Lajos bácsi
 Die kleine Figur meines Vaters (1980) - Editor-in-chief
 The Heiresses (1980) - Komáromi
 Ki beszél itt szerelemről? (1980) - Dr. Csollány Tibor
 The Man Who Went Up in Smoke (1980) - Mr. Sós
 Temné slunce (1981) - James
 The Little Fox (1981) - Vahúr (voice)
 Maria's Day (1984) - Szendrey Ignác
 Lily in Love (1984) - Teodor
 Az élet muzsikája - Kálmán Imre (1984) - Kálmán Imre apja
 Küldetés Evianba (1988) - Az Egyesült Államok küldötte
 Meeting Venus (1991) - 1st Violinist M. Leuchter
 Prinzenbad (1993) - Schlee
 A gólyák mindig visszatérnek (1993) - Nagypapa

References

External links
 

1915 births
1997 deaths
Hungarian male film actors
Male actors from Budapest
20th-century Hungarian male actors